Alexandra Gilbreath (born 28 March 1969) is an English actress, born in Chalfont St Giles, Buckinghamshire and trained at the London Academy of Music and Dramatic Art.

Widely known for her role as depressed author Lucy Moss in Not Going Out. Work both on stage and onscreen (in film and on television), Gilbreath is an Associate Artist with the Royal Shakespeare Company, gaining notice for her work in productions of Romeo and Juliet, As You Like It, The Taming of the Shrew (for which she received a Helen Hayed Award nomination for Best Actress), The Tamer Tamed, The Winter's Tale and Merry Wives: the Musical. She was nominated for an Olivier award as Best Supporting Actress for her performance as Olivia in the RSC's Twelfth Night, directed by Greg Doran, which played at the Duke of York's Theatre in the West End in 2010. She was also awarded the 1996 Ian Charleson Award for her performance as the title character in Hedda Gabler for the English Touring Theatre.

Gilbreath's work on the British television series Monarch of the Glen as Stella Moon brought her worldwide attention.  She was then seen in Life Begins, with Caroline Quentin and Alexander Armstrong. Other television credits include episodes of Absolute Power, Midsomer Murders, The Commander, Casualty and Trial & Retribution. She is probably best known to ITV audiences for playing the original Sun Hill Serial Killer Pat Kitson on The Bill. In 2006, she appeared in episode one of the sitcom Not Going Out as depressed author Lucy Moss.

Gilbreath appeared as Alice Ford in the Royal Shakespeare Company Christmas production of The Merry Wives Of Windsor, at the Royal Shakespeare Theatre, Stratford upon Avon. The production, directed by Philip Breen, ran from 29 October 2012 to 12 January 2013. Her work at the Royal Shakespeare Company includes "Shakespeare Live! From The RSC", broadcast by the BBC to celebrate William Shakespeare’s birthday and the 400th anniversary of his death. She also worked with the RSC at the Swan Theatre on their production of Aphra Behn's The Rover. At the Bush Theatre in London, she premiered Oscar winner Rebecca Lenkiewicz’s play, The Invisible, directed by Michael Oakley.

In 2015 Gilbreath filmed the Justin Chadwick-directed Tulip Fever, with Alicia Vikander and Christoph Waltz, and appeared as Georgina Francis in the BBC TV series Father Brown episode "The Time Machine". She has worked with Trevor Nunn twice - on The Wars Of The Roses in Kingston and Dessert at the Southwark Playhouse. She also performed in the World Premiere of Florian Zeller's The Lie, directed by Lindsay Posner, and appeared at the Hampstead Theatre in the black comedy Mother Christmas.

In 2019, she returned to the Royal Shakespeare Company to play Lady Brute in the Restoration comedy The Provoked Wife.

Filmography

Films

TV

References

External links

1969 births
Living people
English stage actresses
English television actresses
English film actresses
English musical theatre actresses
Ian Charleson Award winners
Alumni of the London Academy of Music and Dramatic Art
People from Chalfont St Giles
Royal Shakespeare Company members
Actresses from Buckinghamshire
20th-century English actresses
21st-century English actresses